Aldolase C, fructose-bisphosphate (ALDOC, or ALDC), is an enzyme that, in humans, is encoded by the ALDOC gene on chromosome 17. This gene encodes a member of the class I fructose-bisphosphate aldolase gene family. Expressed specifically in the hippocampus and Purkinje cells of the brain, the encoded protein is a glycolytic enzyme that catalyzes the reversible aldol cleavage of  fructose 1,6-bisphosphate and fructose-1-phosphate to dihydroxyacetone phosphate and either glyceraldehyde 3-phosphate or glyceraldehyde, respectively.[provided by RefSeq, Jul 2008]

Structure 

ALDOC is one of the three aldolase isozymes (A, B, and C), encoded by three different genes. The amino acid sequence of ALDOC is highly similar to those of the other isozymes, sharing a 68% identity with ALDOB and 78% identity with ALDOA. In particular, the residues Asp33, Arg42, Lys107, Lys146, Glu187, Ser271, Arg303, and Lys229 are all conserved in the active sites of the three isozymes. This active site is located in the center of the homotetrameric αβ-barrel structure of these aldolases. However, several structural details set ALDOC apart. For instance, the Arg303 residue in ALDOC adopts an intermediate conformation between the liganded and unliganded structures observed in the other isozymes. Also, the C-terminal region between Glu332 and Lys71 forms a salt bridge with the barrel region that is absent in the A and B isoforms. Moreover, the electrostatic surface of ALDOC is more negatively charged, which may serve as an acidic binding site or as a docking site to accommodate the C-terminal conformations. Four ALDOC-specific residues (N90, V92, R96 and D100) may be key for ALDOC-specific functions.

Function 

ALDOC is a key enzyme in the fourth step of glycolysis, as well as in the reverse pathway gluconeogenesis. It catalyzes the reversible conversion of fructose-1,6-bisphosphate to glyceraldehydes-3-phosphate (G3P), or glyceraldehyde, and dihydroxyacetone phosphate (DHAP) by aldol cleavage. As a result, it is a crucial player in ATP biosynthesis. As an aldolase, ALDOC putatively also contributes to other "moonlighting" functions, though its exact involvements remain unclear. For instance, it binds less tightly to the cytoskeleton than the other isozymes do, likely due to its more acidic pI. In addition, ALDOC participates in the stress-response pathway for lung epithelial cell function during hypoxia and in the resistance of cerebellar Purkinje cells against excitotoxic insult.

ALDOC is ubiquitously expressed in most tissues, though it is predominantly expressed in brain, smooth muscle, and neuronal tissue. However, since the ALDOA isoform is co-expressed with ALDOC in the central nervous system (CS), it is suggested that ALDOC contributes to CNS function outside of glycolysis. Moreover, its presence within other cell types, such as platelets and mast cells (MCs), may serve as a failsafe in the case that the other predominant aldolase isozymes become inactivated. Within cells, it localizes to the cytoplasm.

Clinical significance 

This aldolase has been associated with cancer.

ALDOC is found to be upregulated in the brains of schizophrenia (SCZ) patients. Notably, while ALDOC is differentially expressed in the anterior cingulate cortex (ACC) of male SCZ patients, it displays no significant changes in female SCZ patients, indicating that different regulatory mechanisms may be involved in male versus female SCZ patients. It is likely that ALDOC is involved in SCZ through its role in glycolysis, which is a central biochemical pathway in SCZ.

Furthermore, ALDOC is reported to undergo oxidation in brains affected by mild cognitive impairment (MCI) and Alzheimer's disease (AD). This oxidative modification inhibits ALDOC activity, causing the accumulation of fructose 1,6- bisphosphate and driving the reverse reaction, in the direction of gluconeogenesis rather than glycolysis, thus halting ATP production.

Interactive pathway map

See also 
ALDOA
ALDOB
Fructose-bisphosphate aldolase

References

Further reading

External links 
 

Enzymes